"The Bells" is a 1970 single recorded by The Originals for Motown's Soul label, produced by Marvin Gaye and co-written by Gaye, his wife Anna Gordy Gaye, Iris Gordy, and Elgie Stover.

History

Shortly after the release of the Originals' first hit "Baby, I'm for Real", Motown issued this similarly produced record, which was a Marvin Gaye production. Gaye had proved skeptics at the label wrong by producing a hit song for another act. Both "Baby I'm for Real" and "The Bells" set the precedent for Gaye's 1971 landmark album What's Going On.

Primarily functioning as background session singers at Motown during much of the 1960s, The Originals would continue to provide background vocals for Gaye until 1973.

"The Bells" peaked at number 12 on the Billboard Hot 100 in the United States, and reached number four on the Hot Black Singles chart. It remains the most successful single of the group's career, the rest of which included several more Gaye-produced R&B hits and the Frank Wilson and Michael B. Sutton's disco dance hit "Down to Love Town".

Chart performance

Personnel
 Lead vocals by Walter Gaines, Henry Dixon and C.P. Spencer
 Background vocals by The Originals: Freddie Gorman, Walter Gaines, Henry Dixon and C.P. Spencer
 Spoken interlude by Freddie Gorman
 Instrumentation by The Funk Brothers, Marvin Gaye (drums) and the Detroit Symphony Orchestra

Other Covers

Laura Nyro version
On her 1971 album Gonna Take a Miracle, singer-songwriter Laura Nyro performed a version of "The Bells" with backing vocals by the group Labelle.

Color Me Badd version
Two decades later, 1990s R&B band Color Me Badd covered the song on their 1993 album, Time and Chance. Much like After 7's cover of "Baby I'm for Real" two years prior, the song entered the R&B charts again, but didn't prove to be as successful as After 7's venture.

References

1970 singles
1971 singles
1994 singles
The Originals (band) songs
Motown singles
Songs written by Marvin Gaye
Songs written by Anna Gordy Gaye
Song recordings produced by Marvin Gaye
Songs written by Elgie Stover
1970 songs